Matsubaraea is a monotypic genus of percomorph fish from the subfamily Hemerocoetinae. The only species in the genus, Matsubaraea fusiforme is found in the western Pacific in the waters around Japan, Thailand and the Philippines on sandy substrates. It feeds on mysids. The generic name honours the Japanese ichthyologist Shinnosuke Matsubara who was director of Imperial Fisheries in Tokyo.

References

Percophidae
Monotypic fish genera
Fish described in 1943